Crassula picturata is a species of plant in the family Crassulaceae, native to Cape Province in South Africa. It is a stemless plant with triangular, dark green leaves measuring approximately 10–12 cm long by 1 cm wide.

References

 University of Connecticut: Ecology & Evolutionary Biology Greenhouses
 Urs Eggli, Illustrated handbook of succulent plants: Crassulaceae, Volume 5, Birkhäuser, 2003. .
 Doreen Court, Succulent flora of southern Africa, CRC Press, 2000, page 82. .

picturata